Kim Hye-soo (born September 5, 1970) is a South Korean actress. Kim was one of the most popular teen stars in the 1980s and 1990s. She is known for her headstrong independence and regularly playing strong-willed, sophisticated women.

Kim began her career in an advertisement for Nestlé Milo in 1985. She made her film debut as a leading actress in the film Kambo (1986), for which she received her first accolade as Best New Actress at 1987 Baeksang Arts Awards. She was the youngest winner of the Blue Dragon Film Award for Best Leading Actress in First Love (1993). Her most commercially successful role was Madam Jeong in the crime film Tazza: The High Rollers (2006), which also won her third Blue Dragon Film Award for Best Actress.

Aside from her performances in films, Kim has appeared in many successful television series, including Partner (1994-1998), Did We Really Love? (1999), Jang Hee Bin (2002), The Queen of Office (2013), Signal (2016), Hyena (2020), Juvenile Justice (2022), and Under the Queen's Umbrella (2022).

Early life and education
Kim Hye-soo was born on September 5, 1970, in Busan, Dongnae District, the second of five children. She moved to Seoul Midong Elementary School while she was in third grade at Busan National Elementary School due to her father's work. While in elementary school, she was a member of the national Taekwondo children's demonstration team, and in April 1982 was the flower girl to present a bouquet to Juan Antonio Samaranch, the seventh President of the International Olympic Committee (IOC).

Career

1985–1991: Career beginnings and break into cinema 
In 1985, Kim featured in a commercial for Nestlé Milo and as well as the first K-pop music video, Cho Yong-pil's title song Empty In The Air.
In 1986, Kim made her film debut on Kambo when she was a first-year high school student. She also won Best New Actress for Kambo at 23rd Baeksang Arts Awards. Kim went on to play the leading roles in the television series Samogok (1987), Sun Shim-yi (1988), and Senoya (1989). She co-starred with Roh Joo-hyun in When The Flowers Bloom And The Birds Cry (1990). In 1991, she landed the main role in Lost Love.

1992–1998: Television series and film success 
Kim is referred to as a "Pencil Board Star" of the 1980's due to the popularity of pencil boards printed with her image. She has also been named a part of the "Troika of the 1990s" in Korea along with her contemporaries Kim Hee-sun and Shim Eun-ha for their nationwide fame. In 1993, Kim leaded the main role in the film First Love and gained critical acclaim for her portrayal of the archetypal innocent girl, winning a Blue Dragon Film Award for Best Leading Actress and earning her the title "Nation's First Love" although the film was a box-office failure.

1999–2004: Development of her career 
Over two decades, she amassed a sizeable filmography of leading and supporting roles, notably in the television series Did We Really Love? with Bae Yong-joon and Revenge and Passion with Ahn Jae-wook, as well as the film Tie a Yellow Ribbon (1998). In the 2000s, Kim focused more on her career in film rather than television, featuring in Kick the Moon, YMCA Baseball Team and Three. At this time, she reinvented her image as a glamorous and confident femme fatale in Hypnotized (2004),

2005–2011: Revival by Tazza 
Kim's roles in The Red Shoes (2005) and Tazza: The High Rollers (2006) were her most recognised and entered her in the Korean film industry A-list. Various film roles followed, such as a housewife secretly dating a college student in A Good Day to Have an Affair; an unaffected aunt in Shim's Family; a prostitute in Eleventh Mom and a bar singer in Modern Boy (2008). She considers her collaboration with Han Suk-kyu in 2010's Villain and Widow as one of the highlights of her acting career. In 2009, Kim returned to television with Style, which is set in the fashion industry. She followed that with the mystery melodrama Home Sweet Home in 2010.

A frequent host of film awards ceremonies and TV variety shows, Kim signed on as the host of MBC current affairs show W. Kim, an avid watcher of documentaries, was found by the production team to be a fit for the programme as that began to focus more on environmental and global issues. W with Kim Hye-soo premiered in July 2010, but was cancelled in October 2010, with Kim criticizing the network's decision.

2012–2015: Film success 

In 2012, she reunited with Tazza director Choi Dong-hoon in The Thieves. Set among the casinos of Macau, the heist film became one of the highest grossing films in Korean cinema history. Kim won Top Excellence Award, Actress in Film at 20th Korean Culture and Entertainment Awards This was followed with a supporting role in Han Jae-rim's historical film The Face Reader.

In 2013, she headlined the romantic comedy The Queen of Office (also known as Goddess of the Workplace), an adaptation of 2007 Japanese drama Haken no Hinkaku ("Pride of the Temp").

Kim next starred in Coin Locker Girl (also known as Chinatown) in 2015, a rare female-driven noir film. She said she didn't mind looking unattractive for her role as a ruthless crime boss, with makeup artists adding age spots to her face, gray to her hair, and flab to her stomach and hips with prostheses. Kim said it was "mentally agonizing" deciding whether to accept the role, but once she did, she felt "a surge of excitement" every time she stepped onto the set, and considered the film "a new challenge that (made her) heart race and (scared her) at the same time."

2016–present: Return to television and film 
Kim made her small-screen comeback in 2016 with tvN's Signal, which was both critically and commercially successful. Kim acted opposite Lee Je-hoon and Cho Jin-woong as Cha Soo-hyun, first woman police officer in the Special Task Force, later become the leader of the Seoul cold case squad. She won Best Actress at the 52nd Baeksang Arts Awards and the tvN10 Awards for her performance.

Kim then starred in the comedy drama film Familyhood, film directed by Kim Tae-gon, co-starring Ma Dong-seok and Kim Hyun-soo. Kim was nominated as Best Actress at 25th Buil Film Awards, 37th Blue Dragon Film Awards, and 53rd Baeksang Arts Awards

In 2017, Kim also starred in noir film A Special Lady. Directed by Lee An-gyu, Kim played  Na Hyun-jung, woman who becomes the second-in-command of a gangster organization-turned-leading business entity, opposite Lee Sun-kyun and Lee Hee-joon.

In 2018, Kim starred in the IMF crisis film, Default, alongside Yoo Ah-in. She was nominated for Best Actress at 55th Baeksang Arts Awards. Then She was cast in the science fiction film Return. 

in June 2019, Kim was confirmed to appear The Day I Died: Unclosed Case, Park Ji-wan's directorial debut. The film released on November 12, 2020. Kim was nominated at 57th Baeksang Arts Awards in Best Actress Film category.

In 2020, Kim starred in the legal drama Hyena. She acted as Lawyer Jung Geum-ja, a true hyena that chases after money and success no matter what it takes. It aired on SBS TV from February 21 to April 11, 2020. She was nominated for Best Actress at 56th Baeksang Arts Awards.

In March 2022, Kim gained international recognition for her lead role as judge Shim Eun-seok in the Netflix series Juvenile Justice as the most popular non-English show for two weeks straight. She was nominated for Best Actress at 58th Baeksang Arts Awards. The same year she starred in the tvN historical drama Under the Queen's Umbrella as Queen Im Hwa-ryeong.

Personal life

Public image and character
Kim has been a popular Korean sex symbol since she wore a low-cut dress as a Blue Dragon Film Awards host and Best Actress winner in 1993, and was emblematic of the era's sexual revolution.

Kim is known for taking good care of younger actors, and has been described by co-star Ma Dong-seok in Familyhood (2016) to be "the most considerate person to care for others." Her co-star Lee Sang-hee in the TV series Juvenile Justice said "Kim would write down unknown actors' names when she thought their acting was good, so that she could recommend them for suitable scripts in the future." Many actresses, including Son Ye-jin,  Han Ji-min,Kim Nam-joo, and Yum Jung-ah have expressed special thanks and gratitude to Kim for her care.

Kim has a bachelor's in theater and film from Dongguk University. In 2013, Kim admitted to having plagiarized her master's thesis "A Study on Actor Communication," with parts copied verbatim from at least four books. She apologized for her actions, which she said was caused by her busy schedule and ignorance of plagiarism as a serious offence. Kim forfeited her master's degree in journalism and mass communications as a result.

Relationships
Kim and character actor Yoo Hae-jin first met in 2001 after shooting the film Kick the Moon and became close in 2006 after appearing together in Tazza: The High Rollers. Rumors of the two dating surfaced starting 2008 although both continuously denied any romantic involvement until early 2010 when paparazzi photographs of the two were released, and the couple officially confirmed their relationship. Kim and Yoo broke up in 2011.

Philanthropy 
In 2008, Kim donated the full amount of the narration fees of the documentary film "Forgiveness, Are You at the End of the Way" to the crime victim support fund. In April, 2009, Kim displayed her pop art at the Seoul Open Art Fair. On July 7, 2009, Kim participated in the "Style Meets Art" campaign co-hosted by cable channel OnStyle and Korean National Commission for UNESCO and she donated the proceeds of her donated works to the Korean National Commission for UNESCO.

Kim donated  for forest fire victims affected by the Goseong Fire of 2019.

In 2020, for the mask shortage caused by the COVID-19 pandemic, Kim donated  to Hope Bridge Disaster Relief Association.

On August 9, 2022, Kim donated  to help those affected by the 2022 South Korean floods through the Hope Bridge Korea Disaster Relief Association.

On February 10, 2023, Kim donated  to help 2023 Turkey–Syria earthquake, by donating money through Hope Bridge National Disaster Relief Association.and in the same month Kim posted a photo of the briquette service, which was the briquettes she donated.

Filmography

Film

Television series

Web series

Hosting

Discography

Awards and nominations

Listicles

Notes

References

Sources

External links 

 
 
 
 

20th-century South Korean actresses
21st-century South Korean actresses
South Korean film actresses
South Korean television actresses
South Korean female models
Dongguk University alumni
Actresses from Busan
1970 births
Living people
South Korean Buddhists
Best Actress Paeksang Arts Award (film) winners
Best Actress Paeksang Arts Award (television) winners